Guttorm Berge (19 April 1929 – 13 March 2004) was a Norwegian Alpine skier.

He was born in Vardal and died in Høvik.

At the 1952 Olympics in Oslo Berge was bronze medalist in the slalom, 1.7 seconds behind gold winner Othmar Schneider.

Berge was a 1954 graduate of Middlebury College.

References

External links

 profile

1929 births
2004 deaths
Norwegian male alpine skiers
Olympic alpine skiers of Norway
Alpine skiers at the 1952 Winter Olympics
Alpine skiers at the 1956 Winter Olympics
Olympic bronze medalists for Norway
Olympic medalists in alpine skiing
Medalists at the 1952 Winter Olympics
Sportspeople from Gjøvik
Middlebury College alumni